A noggin is a small drinking cup, generally carved from the burr (English) or burl (US) of a tree. The noggin was first mentioned in the mid 17th century, initially as the cup, and later coming to mean a quarter of a pint equal to a gill. Its use later spread to North America.

The cup's origins are not certain, but are probably from nog (a strong type of ale brewed in Norfolk, England). The noggin then became a noigin (Irish) or noigean (Gaelic).

See also 
 Coffee cup
 Fuddling cup
 Guksi
 Plastic cup

References 

Drinkware